Karma Cartel is a 2011 Malayalam-language film produced and directed by Vinod Bharathan.

The film is a modern day's look at India's growing economy and fast cash culture that the modern Indian youth are enticed by. Told through the actions of 6 people living different lives, the plot is interconnected through a single thread – easy money. The film follows a struggling actor and his foolish friend, who brings them into trouble, exposing an array of others who are also linked by the incident.

Plot

Sidth who is an upcoming actor, is best friends with Richie, who is constantly on the lookout for business opportunities. Sidth tries his luck at film sets and casting's and is frustrated at the negative feedback. Sidth's meeting with an indie film director fuels his hopes for his career. Richie, who meets an old friend of his, gets an idea to make some easy money. He invests in a ponzi scheme without Sidth knowing about it in detail. Sidth attends a casting for a big film producer, who in turns wants Sidth to give him sexual service in exchange for the role.

Dr Roy is a medical practitioner, who is also addicted to the real estate business. The addiction leads to debts and deadlines for payments begin interfering in his work. He has to pay Franko, a money-lending thug, 5,000 by the weekend. He contacts Deejay to make some money out of a rushed deal. He also invests in a fast cash scheme as second option, the same where Richie had invested.

Q, the Indie film director who needs money for his production, goes to meet Franko under Deejays recommendation. Sidth tags along as the lead actor of the film. While meeting Franko, Sidth sees Shaji, a money collector and learns that he always has a stack of cash in his sling bag.

Arjun and Tina have been dating for a while. Arjun, who is busy with his "business", is still a mystery to Tina. Tina is a divorcee who thinks that she has her life totally in control. Arjun surprises her by proposing to her and without her knowing, she falls in too deep for Arjun.

Tony is an Indian living abroad. He had been involved in a business with someone in India while he was abroad. His partner in India cheats him, and Tony now wants to teach him a lesson. Tony contacts Luttu and Plan B, two bounty hunters who use threats before harm to their victims. Luttu and Plan B are film enthusiasts who live and behave like film stars.

Luttu and Plan B tracks Tony's Indian business partner and discovers that he is also known as Arjun, Tina's fiancée. They discover that Arjun had transferred all the money to U.S.A. Luttu takes Arjun's phone to track down all who Arjun has dealings with. Luttu gives the bad news to Richie and Dr Roy, meanwhile Plan B finds a receipt of a diamond ring in Arjun's room. They decide to fetch it as their pay for the job. They beat Arjun badly and put him in the boot of at the car and head towards the cafe that he was supposed to meet Tina. Luttu now tells Tina the true side of Arjun, and she is in a state of disbelief. She asks for proof and Luttu asks her to check the boot of his car. Tina sees Arjun and realizes that Luttu was right. She is angry at first, but as the car drives away, she realises that she had let her fences down Arjun had gone in too deep into her heart. She is heartbroken.

Richie, who had taken money from his parents to make the quick buck, is now panicking about the loss of it all. He tells Sidth about it. As they panic, Sidth sees Franko's collector Shaji walking past them. Sidth mentions that Shaji must have at least 60,000 in his bag, and hopes Shaji forgets his bag somewhere so Richie can get the money. Richie follows Shaji to a lane where he snatches the bag and runs. Richie runs straight to Sidth, and finds that there is not much money in the bag, as Dr Roy who had to pay Franko, has delayed his payments again. Shaji tracks Richie and sees him standing beside Sidth who he recognizes from Franko's place during the meeting with indie director.

Franko, who is angry that Sidth and his friend tried to overpower Shaji, calls Deejay and tells him that he is going to teach them a lesson. Franko decides to shake all the late payers, including Dr Roy.

Deejay calls Sidth to find out what went wrong. Sidth explains, and Deejay tells them to leave the city if they want to stay alive. Sidth and Richie decide to take the next train to Mumbai.

Dr Roy gets fired from his job, as the hospital has had enough of his distractions at work. Dr Roy who has lost his job, and has no successful real estate deals, now faces Franko's thugs who take his car away.

While waiting for the train, Richie comes with one last crazy idea to sell their motorbike before they leave to Mumbai. Sidth calls him a fool, but gets a better idea. He borrows the bike and rides to the hotel where a film producer offered to cast him earlier. He lashes all his anger out on the producer by beating him up and steals all his money. He reaches the train station just in time as the train they have bought tickets to was leaving the station. They both run and hop on the speeding train. They leave to Mumbai, smiling.

Cast

 Vinay Forrt as Sidth
 Dr Rony David as Dr Roy
 Tony Luke as Tony
 Jinu Joseph as Indie Filmmaker
 Arjun Chemparathy as Arjun
 Shani Shaki as Plan B
 Rohini Miriam Idicula as the reporter
 Becky Thomas as Tina Roy
 Ahamed Shaheen as Richie
 Assistant Commissioner of Police
 Troju Jacob as Head Surgeon
 Madan Babu as Film Producer
 Sabumon Abdusamad as Luttu
 Franko Davis Manjilla as Franko Ex-Gangster
 Lukmance as Casting Agent
 Suraj Ramakrishan as Deejay the fixer
 Joseph Chakola as Facebook Friend
 Varna Velloth as Doctor 1
 Mathew Thomas as Doctor 2
 Rishi Karthik as Book Salesman
 Avinash as Home-Stay Owner
 Shaji T.U. as Money Collector
 Roopesh K.V. as Dr Rupesh

Production

Karma Code was the first short film in the Vinod Bharathan's 'Karma series' with forgiveness as its theme. It was followed by Karma Currency, a 16-minute short film on the theme corruption. It was while he was working on Karma Currency that he realized that it was time he made his first feature concluding the Karma series. Karma Cartel is the last film in Karma series by Vinod Bharathan.

Shooting as much as six scenes a day, Vinod juggled the ensemble of 25 actors using Microsoft Excel charts he had earlier prepared in anticipation. Dialogues for the scenes were often improvised in front of the rolling camera, and fewer times did they have the luxury to develop it an hour before the take. Vinod shot the entire scenes in long takes, and the longest single take with the indie filmmaker (Jinu Joseph) telling the story to the actor lasts 7 minutes, which was later taken out of the festival version edit as Vinod thought it would be hard for the foreign audience to follow.

The film was shot with a two-member crew with Vinod behind the camera assisted by the sound recordist. Apart from the four cast members of Karma series, the rest of the cast were non-professionals or have never acted before.

Themes
The film uses a social, situational, commentary on the current state of the Indian film industry. It touches on impact of Facebook on film industry and how it has altered the influence of the film craze of the Indian people in general.

Reception
Karma Cartel premiered at the 2011 International Film Festival Ahmedabad, and also showed at Cochin Film Society at Kochi and later traveled to film festivals in Canada, America and Italy, where it won Award of Excellence in filmmaking at Canada International Film Festival 2014, and Best First Time Director Award at American Movie Awards, Nevada, 2014. The Director Vinod Bharathan won the Best Director Award at CinemaVvenire Film Festival, Rome 2014.

References

External links
 

2011 films
Indian independent films
Films shot in Kochi
2010s Malayalam-language films